Good Things is the fourth album by the Swedish hip hop group Looptroop Rockers. It was released in 2008 by Bad Taste Records and is entirely produced by Embee. It is the first album released after the retirement of band member CosM.I.C. and also the first one released under the name Looptroop Rockers. Despite leaving the group, CosM.I.C. does make an appearance on the track Al Mazika. Good Things also features the first cover song on any of the group's albums, Livin' on a Prayer, originally performed by Bon Jovi.

Track listing
"Family First"
"The Building"
"Marinate"
"Stains" (ft. Mapei)
"Living on a Prayer"
"Rome"
"Ginger & Lemon"
"Naïve" (ft. Timbuktu)
"Al Mazika" (ft. Alibi, CosM.I.C.)
"Blood & Urine"
"Trance Fat" (ft. Rakaa Iriscience)
"The Busyness"
"Puzzle"

External links 
 

2008 albums
Looptroop Rockers albums
Bad Taste Records albums